The North Carolina State League was a "Class D" league in Minor League Baseball. The original version of the league existed from 1913–1917 as the successor to the Carolina Association.  The second version of the league was established in 1937 in part in order to compete with the Piedmont-region independent league, the Carolina League, and ran through 1953 when it combined with the Western Carolina League to form the Tar Heel League.

Cities represented

1913–1917 
Asheville, NC: Asheville Mountaineers 1913–1915; Asheville Tourists 1916–1917 
Charlotte, NC: Charlotte Hornets 1913–1917, moved from Carolina Association 1908–1912 
Durham, NC: Durham Bulls 1913–1917
Greensboro, NC: Greensboro Patriots 1913–1917, moved from Carolina Association 1908–1912 
Raleigh, NC: Raleigh Capitals 1913–1917 
Winston-Salem, NC: Winston-Salem Twins 1913–1917, moved from Carolina Association 1908–1912

1937–1942, 1945–1952 
Albemarle, NC: Albemarle Rockets 1948
Concord, NC: Concord Weavers 1939–1942, 1945–1948; Concord Nationals 1949–1950;  Concord Sports 1951
Cooleemee, NC: Cooleemee Weavers 1937–1938; Cooleemee Cools 1939; Cooleemee Cards 1940–1941
Elkin, NC:  Elkin Blanketeers 1951–1952
Gastonia, NC: Gastonia Cardinals 1938, moved to Tar Heel League 1939–1940
Hickory, NC: Hickory Rebels 1942, 1945–1951, moved to Western Carolina League 1952
High Point, NC & Thomasville, NC:  High Point-Thomasville Hi-Toms 1948–1952, moved to Tar Heel League 1953
Kannapolis, NC: Kannapolis Towelers 1939-1941
Landis, NC:  Landis Sens 1937-1939; Landis Dodgers 1940; Landis Senators 1941;  Landis Millers 1942, 1945–1947; Landis Spinners 1949–1951
Lexington, NC: Lexington Indians 1937–1942;  Lexington A's 1945–1948; Lexington Indians 1949;  Lexington A's 1950; Lexington Indians 1951–1952, moved to Tar Heel League 1953
Mooresville, NC: Mooresville Moors 1937–1942, 1946–1952, Mooresville Braves (1945), moved to Tar Heel League 1953
Newton, NC & Conover, NC: Newton-Conover Twins 1937–1938, moved to Tar Heel League 1939–1940
Salisbury, NC: Salisbury Bees 1937–1938; Salisbury Giants 1939–1942;  Salisbury Pirates 1945–1952
Shelby, NC:  Shelby Cardinals 1937–1938
Statesville, NC: Statesville Owls 1942; Statesville Cubs 1945–1946;  Statesville Owls 1947–1952
Thomasville, NC: Thomasville Chairmakers 1937; Thomasville Orioles 1938; Thomasville Tommies 1939–1942;  Thomasville Dodgers 1945–1947; see High Point

References

External links
North Carolina State League chart
Baseball Reference

Defunct minor baseball leagues in the United States
Baseball leagues in North Carolina
1913 establishments in North Carolina
Sports leagues established in 1913
Sports leagues disestablished in 1952
Sports leagues disestablished in 1917
Sports leagues established in 1937
Sports leagues disestablished in 1942
Sports leagues established in 1945